Marc Echarri Marín (born 4 March 1999) is a Spanish footballer who plays for Rayo Vallecano B as a forward.

Club career
Born in Manzanares el Real, Community of Madrid, Echarri finished his formation with Aravaca CF. On 7 July 2018, he moved to AD Alcorcón and was initially assigned to the reserves in the Tercera División.

Echarri made his senior debut on 9 September 2018, starting in a 0–1 home loss against AD Parla. On 4 February of the following year, after ten goalless matches, he signed for fellow league team CF Trival Valderas.

On 21 June 2019, Echarri joined another reserve team, Rayo Vallecano B also in the fourth tier. He made his first-team debut the following 5 January, coming on as a late substitute for Federico Piovaccari in a 1–0 home defeat of Girona FC in the Segunda División.

References

External links

1999 births
Living people
Spanish footballers
Footballers from the Community of Madrid
Association football forwards
Segunda División players
Tercera División players
AD Alcorcón B players
CF Trival Valderas players
Rayo Vallecano B players
Rayo Vallecano players